Pecado de amor is a 1961 Argentine musical drama film directed by Luis César Amadori and starred by Sara Montiel, Rafael Alonso and Reginald Kernan. It was produced by Cesáreo González and Benito Perojo, written by Gabriel Peña, Jesús María de Arozamena and Luis César Amadori and composed by Gregorio García Segura.

Cast

References

External links
 

1961 films
1960s Spanish-language films
Argentine black-and-white films
Films directed by Luis César Amadori
Films produced by Cesáreo González
Films produced by Benito Perojo
Films scored by Gregorio García Segura
Suevia Films films
1960s Argentine films